Cape Mount may refer to:

 Cape Monze, a beach in Pakistan
 Cape Mount Nature Conservation Unit, a reserve in Liberia
 Grand Cape Mount County, a county in Liberia